The 52nd parallel south is a circle of latitude that is 52 degrees south of the Earth's equatorial plane. It crosses the Atlantic Ocean, the Indian Ocean, the Pacific Ocean and South America.

The parallel defines part of the border between Argentina and Chile.

At this latitude the sun is visible for 16 hours, 44 minutes during the December solstice and 7 hours, 44 minutes during the June solstice.

Around the world
Starting at the Prime Meridian and heading eastwards, the parallel 52° south passes through:

{| class="wikitable plainrowheaders"
! scope="col" width="125" | Co-ordinates
! scope="col" | Country, territory or ocean
! scope="col" | Notes
|-
| style="background:#b0e0e6;" | 
! scope="row" style="background:#b0e0e6;" | Atlantic Ocean
| style="background:#b0e0e6;" |
|-
| style="background:#b0e0e6;" | 
! scope="row" style="background:#b0e0e6;" | Indian Ocean
| style="background:#b0e0e6;" |
|-
| style="background:#b0e0e6;" | 
! scope="row" style="background:#b0e0e6;" | Pacific Ocean
| style="background:#b0e0e6;" |
|-valign="top"
| 
! scope="row" | 
| Patagonic Archipelago and mainland, Magallanes Region
|-
| 
! scope="row" |  /  border
|
|-
| 
! scope="row" | 
| Santa Cruz Province
|-
| style="background:#b0e0e6;" | 
! scope="row" style="background:#b0e0e6;" | Atlantic Ocean
| style="background:#b0e0e6;" |
|-
| 
! scope="row" | 
| Dyke Island and West Falkland (claimed by )
|-
| style="background:#b0e0e6;" | 
! scope="row" style="background:#b0e0e6;" | Atlantic Ocean
| style="background:#b0e0e6;" | Falkland Sound
|-
| 
! scope="row" | 
| East Falkland and Lively Island (claimed by )
|-
| style="background:#b0e0e6;" | 
! scope="row" style="background:#b0e0e6;" | Atlantic Ocean
| style="background:#b0e0e6;" |
|}

See also
51st parallel south
53rd parallel south

References

s52
Argentina–Chile border